SMS S119  was a  of the Imperial German Navy that served during the First World War. The ship was built by Schichau at Elbing in Prussia (now Elbląg in Poland), and was completed in September 1903. The ship was sunk during the Battle off Texel on 17 October 1914.

Construction and design
The S90-class consisted of 48 torpedo-boats, built between 1898 and 1907 by Schichau and Germaniawerft for the Imperial German Navy. They were larger than previous German torpedo-boats, allowing them to work effectively with the High Seas Fleet in the North Sea, while also being large enough to act as flotilla leader when necessary, thus eliminating the need for separate larger division boats.

S119 was one of a group of six torpedo boats built by Schichau between 1902 and 1903. She was launched from Schichau's Elbing shipyard on 8 July 1903 and commissioned on 6 September 1903.

While the S90-class were of similar size to contemporary foreign torpedo-boat destroyers, the German navy saw their role as primarily torpedo attack against opposing fleets, rather than defending their own fleet against attack, so the ships had a lighter gun armament than British destroyers, and a lower silhouette to avoid detection during night attacks. S119 had a gun armament of three 5 cm SK L/40 guns in single mounts, while torpedo armament consisted of three single 450 mm torpedo tubes (one in a well deck between the raised forecastle and the bridge, with the remaining two tubes aft of the bridge. Two reload torpedoes were carried. The ship had a complement of 49 officers and men.

Service
In May 1904 S119 was the Division boat or leader of the 6th Torpedo-boat Division of the 1st Torpedo-boat Flotilla, while in 1907, she was division boat of the 8th Half-flotilla of the 2nd School Flotilla. In 1910, she was listed as leader of the 9th Half-Flotilla of the 5th Torpedoboat Flotilla, remaining there until 1912. In 1913 S119 was fitted with new boilers. In 1914, S119 was leader of the 7th Half-Flotilla of the 4th Torpedo-boat Flotilla.

S119 remained part of the 7th Half-Flotilla on the outbreak of the First World War in August 1914. In October 1914, in an attempt to take advantage of the Royal Navy's distraction by operations in the English Channel, the German Navy decided to lay a minefield off the mouth of the River Thames or in The Downs. Later that day, the four torpedo boats ran into a British patrol on the Broad Fourteens off Terschelling in the Netherlands. S119 attempted a torpedo attack against Undaunted but was sunk by Loyal and Legion. The British rescued 34 officers and men from the four German ships, with two more picked up the next day by a neutral fishing vessel. 47 of S119s crew were lost, including Georg Thiele. On 30 November a British trawler fished up a lead-lined chest that had been jettisoned by S119 before she was sunk. The chest contained a codebook used by flag officers at sea. The destroyer Georg Thiele was named after S119s commanding officer in the 1930s.

References

Bibliography

 
 

 

Torpedo boats of the Imperial German Navy
World War I torpedo boats of Germany
1903 ships
Ships built in Elbing
Ships built by Schichau
Maritime incidents in October 1914
World War I shipwrecks in the North Sea